Wannabes is an online interactive soap and game created for the BBC by Illumna Digital. Wannabes follows on from Jamie Kane, the BBC's previous foray into online interactive drama.  The show/game consists of 14 ten-minute episodes released twice a week.  During the episodes, viewers are prompted to help the character make decisions by selected one out of several possible alternatives.  Depending on the choices made, the viewer/player will win or lose friends points from the different characters, unlocking extra content such as videos, emails and photos.

Story

Wannabes follows the lives of seven teenagers in Brighton as they go through the triumphs and traumas of love, work and quests for fame. It is a 14 episode long series. Leila has moved to Brighton and become a journalist for a local newspaper, Lewis has quit his band to go solo, Charlie has become manager of the Wannabes club, and Jerome has returned from Iraq to win Rachel's heart.

Characters

Charlie - Who wants to be famous and doesn't care what for.
Leila - Who wants to be a journalist.
Jerome - Who wants to win Rachel's heart.
Rachel - Who wants to be a professional runner.
Seb - Who wants to be rich.
Jo - Who wants power, and turn Lewis into a success.
Lewis - Who wants to be a rock star.

Episodes

Episode 1 - A Blank Piece of Paper
Episode 2 - Truth and Lies
Episode 3 - Opportunity Knocks
Episode 4 - Work
Episode 5 - Under Covers
Episode 6 - Out on the Edge
Episode 7 - The Big Break Up
Episode 8 - Love and War
Episode 9 - Two Plus Two Makes Five
Episode 10 - Laps and Hurdles
Episode 11 - In and Out
Episode 12 - Tangled Webs
Episode 13 - True Selves
Episode 14 - Home To Roost

Extra content

As part of a viral marketing campaign, MySpace pages have been created for several of the characters, along with YouTube and Flickr entries.  The sites host extra content from the show such as videos, photos, character email addresses and in-character blogs.

References

External links
Lewis's MySpace page
Illumina
News Story on YouTube

Single-player online games
2000s interactive fiction